Portaria (Greek: Πορταριά) is a village and a former municipality in Magnesia, Thessaly, Greece. Since the 2011 local government reform it is part of the municipality Volos, of which it is a municipal unit. The municipal unit has an area of 22.754 km2. It is located on Mt. Pelion, facing the Pagasetic Gulf, north of Volos and its suburbs. The majority of the buildings are typical examples of Pelion architecture with their windows and doors decorated with a variety of colors.  The mountaintop of Pelion is to the north. Portaria every year holds a traditional wedding in the main square of the village and many people from Volos and the surrounding villages drop by to learn how weddings were traditionally done in these villages.

Historical population

Sister cities 
 Tourtour, France

See also
List of settlements in the Magnesia regional unit

References

External links
 Information about Magnesia, Volos and Mt. Pelion
 www.visitportaria.com

Neighboring localities

Populated places in Pelion
Populated places in Magnesia (regional unit)